Altınyazı Dam is a dam in Edirne Province, Turkey, built between 1965 and 1970.

See also
List of dams and reservoirs in Turkey

External links
DSI

Dams in Edirne Province
Dams completed in 1970